Linda Westerlund Snecker (born 3 February 1983) is a Swedish politician.  she serves as Member of the Riksdag representing the constituency of Östergötland County. She is affiliated with the Left Party.

She was also elected as Member of the Riksdag in September 2018 and September 2022.

References 

Living people
1983 births
Place of birth missing (living people)
21st-century Swedish politicians
21st-century Swedish women politicians
Members of the Riksdag 2014–2018
Members of the Riksdag 2018–2022
Members of the Riksdag 2022–2026
Members of the Riksdag from the Left Party (Sweden)
Women members of the Riksdag
Linköping University alumni